"Bidrohi" is a popular revolutionary Bengali poem and the most famous poem written by Kazi Nazrul Islam in December 1921. Originally published in several periodicals, the poem was first collected in October 1922 in a volume titled Agnibeena: the first anthology of Nazrul's poems. Many have seen, in this poem, elements of romanticism, heroism, and love. Syed Ali Ahsan wrote that the poem was inspired by Walt Whitman's "Song of Myself".

Literary style 
This poem, through which Nazrul celebrated human creative powers, asserted his affirmation of the individual human capacity for heroic action and human unity and solemnly called for rebellion against all forms of oppression (including that of the British in India) elevated him to the status of a national figure. He included literary elements from Hindu, Islamic and Greek mythology in this poem.

Publication history 
Upon returning from the first world war in 1919, Kazi Nazrul Islam started living in Kolkata along with his close friend Muzaffar Ahmed. In December 1921, while they were living at Taltala Lane in Kolkata, Nazrul wrote the poem. According to Muzaffar Ahmed, the poem was first published on 6 January 1922 in weekly Bijli Magazine. Upon its release, the poem gained widespread popularity and some other magazines also published the poem including The Moslem Bharat, Prabashi, Modhumati, and Shadhana magazine.

The poem was first collected in October 1922 along with other 11 poems in the book Agneebina published from Arya Publishing House.

100 Years celebration 
2021 marked the 100th year of the poem. The poem's centennial was celebrated around the world including Bangladesh and West Bengal.

Few lines from Bidrohi
I am the unutterable grief,

I am the trembling first touch of the virgin, 
I am the throbbing ten, 
I am the wild fire of the woods, 
I am Hell's mad terrific sea of wrath! 
I ride on the wings of lightning with joy and profundity, 
I scatter misery and fear all around, 
I bring earth-quakes on this world! “(8th stanza)”

Last stanza
Weary of struggles, I, the great rebel, 
Shall rest in quiet only when I find 
The sky and the air free of the piteous groans of the oppressed. 
Only when the battle fields are cleared of jingling bloody sabres 
Shall I, weary of struggles, rest in quiet,  
I am the rebel eternal, 
I raise my head beyond this world and
, 
High, ever erect and alone! “(Last stanza)” (English translation by Kabir Choudhary)

Popular Culture
This poem is directly referenced by the 1995 song Rebel Warrior by Asian Dub Foundation.

References

External links
Kabir Chowdhury's English translation of Bidrohi
Kazi Shabboshachi's Recitation of Bidrohi on Youtube

Bengali-language poems
Poems written by Kazi Nazrul Islam
1921 poems